Show Biz Bugs is a 1957 Warner Bros. Looney Tunes animated short directed by Friz Freleng and featuring Mel Blanc. The short was released on November 2, 1957, and stars Bugs Bunny and Daffy Duck.

Plot
Arriving at the theatre where he and Bugs are appearing, Daffy is furious to discover that the rabbit's name on the marquee is above his in much larger letters. Rebuffed by the unseen manager's claim that he gives his performers billing "according to drawing power", Daffy is determined to prove that he is the star of the show. To add further humiliation, his dressing room is actually a poorly disguised restroom. ("There can be only one explanation for white tile in a dressing room, and that's it!").
   
That evening, Bugs and Daffy are performing an on-stage number to "Tea for Two". Daffy, tired of Bugs hogging up all the cheering and applause (especially after the reception Bugs gets for his "Shave and a Haircut" bit), and convinced he is more talented, decides to try numerous numbers on his own in order to impress the audience.

He begins on the spot with a time step to "Jeepers Creepers". After failing to impress the audience, Daffy attempts to perform a trained Pigeon act. But the pigeons fly out, causing Daffy to have to try to regain dignity by dancing brightly off the stage. When he pokes his head out from behind the curtain, he is hit with a tomato. Bugs does a sawing-in-half trick; Daffy volunteers in hopes of proving that the trick is fake, but ends up literally sawed in half. ("Good thing I got Blue Cross."). Daffy attempts to sabotage Bugs' xylophone act by rigging it to explode when a certain note is played, but Bugs avoids the trap by deliberately playing the final note wrong twice. Frustrated, Daffy plays the tune himself, hits the rigged note and is blown up (this gag was also seen with pianos in Private Snafu, Ballot Box Bunny and Rushing Roulette). In a final attempt to impress the audience while Bugs is Juggling, Daffy in a red Devil's costume performs a deadly stunt (which he refers as "an act that no other performer has dared to execute!"), by drinking a portion of gasoline, some nitroglycerin, a good amount of gunpowder, and some Uranium-238, "shake well", and swallowing a lit match ("Girls, you better hold onto your boyfriends!"), causing him to explode. The audience applauds the act, an impressed Bugs says they want more, but Daffy (now a transparent ghost) replies that he "can only do it once".

Production
The basic setting and conflicts of Show Biz Bugs were reprised for the linking footage for the television series The Bugs Bunny Show. Show Biz Bugs was also re-worked as the climax of The Looney Looney Looney Bugs Bunny Movie (1981).

According to the audio commentary on the second Golden Collection set, the song "The Daughter of Rosie O'Grady" was intended to be used during the sequence where Daffy showcases some trained birds. A pre-score recording was produced, but was not used in the final cartoon. Other pre-score music included slightly longer versions of both "Tea for Two" and "Jeepers Creepers".

This would be the second to last Bugs Bunny and Daffy Duck cartoon Friz Freleng would direct with his musical methods and techniques (the final one would be Person to Bunny released in 1960; though Daffy did make a brief cameo in Apes of Wrath released in 1959 and was also directed by Freleng).

The xylophone gag was previously used in the Private Snafu short Booby Traps and the Bugs/Yosemite Sam short Ballot Box Bunny (and later in the Wile E. Coyote and the Road Runner cartoon Rushing Roulette), except in both cases the instrument used was a piano. The song used in each case, as in Show Biz Bugs, is "Believe Me, if All Those Endearing Young Charms".

The final act and the pigeon circus had been used in an earlier Porky Pig cartoon called Curtain Razor in which a fox does the same act Daffy does attempting to show Porky he is a star, and, much like Show Biz Bugs, the final act in Curtain Razor has been edited on Cartoon Network to remove him ingesting gasoline (the syndicated version of The Merrie Melodies Show also cuts the gasoline-drinking and edits it even further by cutting out the fox swallowing a match).

Reception
In a commentary by Greg Ford, he cites that the short contains some of Warren Foster's "best gags as a writer". Ford also described it as "a definitive Bugs/Daffy showbiz rivalry cartoon".

Comic book writer Mark Evanier writes, "By 1957 there wasn't much about Daffy Duck that was daffy. He'd morphed into a greedy, self-obsessed rival to Bugs... and maybe the most psychotic property in the rarely stable Warner Bros. canon. Show Biz Bugs is enormously funny, though, as we watch him match Bugs Bunny in his self-inflicted destruction of both ego and body."

Music
 "I'm Looking Over a Four Leaf Clover" by Harry M. Woods
 "Tea for Two" by Vincent Youmans
 "Jeepers Creepers" by Harry Warren
 "Believe Me, If All Those Endearing Young Charms" by Thomas Moore

Home media
Show Biz Bugs is available on the Looney Tunes Golden Collection: Volume 2 DVD set, the Looney Tunes Platinum Collection: Volume 2 Blu-ray set, disc 1, and The Essential Bugs Bunny DVD set, disc 1. It also includes an audio commentary by historian Greg Ford along with a "Pre-Score" track that includes earlier versions of "Tea for Two" and "Jeepers Creepers" as well as a version of "The Daughter of Rosie O'Grady" (supposedly to underscore Daffy's "trained pigeons" act) that was ultimately unused. It is also available on the "A Salute to Friz Freleng" VHS, the Superior Duck VHS, and the "Looney Tunes: Curtain Calls" laserdisc.

See also
 List of American films of 1957

References

External links

 
 

1957 films
1957 animated films
1957 short films
1950s American animated films
1950s Warner Bros. animated short films
Short films directed by Friz Freleng
Bugs Bunny films
Daffy Duck films
Films about suicide
Films scored by Milt Franklyn
Films set in a theatre
Looney Tunes shorts
Animated films about revenge
Films produced by Edward Selzer
1950s English-language films